Trail of Robin Hood  is a 1950 American Trucolor Western film directed by William Witney and starring Roy Rogers. Filmed in the San Bernardino Mountains and Big Bear Lake California, it is notable for featuring a large cast of Western stars and the last film that Roy Rogers filmed in Trucolor. Despite the title, there is no reference to Robin Hood in the film.

Plot
Roy is a conservation agent preventing loggers from poaching Jack Holt's Christmas trees.

Cast

Roy Rogers as  Himself
Trigger as  Himself
Penny Edwards as  Toby Aldridge
Gordon Jones as  Splinters McGonigle
Rex Allen as  Himself
Allan Lane as  Himself
Monte Hale as  Himself
William Farnum as  Himself
Tom Tyler as  Himself
Ray Corrigan as  Himself
Kermit Maynard as  Himself
Tom Keene as  Himself
Jack Holt as  Himself
Emory Parnell as  J. Corwin Aldridge
Bobby "Bonedust" Young as  Mitch McCall
James Magill as  Henchman Murtagh
Carol Nugent as  Sis McGonigle
George Chesebro as  Himself (as George Cheeseboro)
Ed Cassidy as  Sheriff Duffy
Foy Willing as  Himself
Stanley Blystone as  Doctor
Riders of the Purple Sage as  Holt's workers

See also
 List of Christmas films

Notes

External links
 

1950 films
1950s English-language films
1950 Western (genre) films
Republic Pictures films
Films directed by William Witney
Films scored by Nathan Scott
American Western (genre) films
American Christmas films
Trucolor films
1950s Christmas films
Films shot in California
Films shot in Los Angeles
American crossover films
1950s American films